Keinan Maru (Japanese: 慶南丸 ) was an auxiliary minesweeper of the Imperial Japanese Navy during World War II.

History
Keinan Maru was laid down on  25 January 1928 at the shipyard of Kobeseikosho Harima Zosen Kojo at the behest of shipping company, Nippon Suisan. She was launched on 22 May 1928 and completed 3 August 1928. On 12 September 1941, she was requisitioned by the Imperial Japanese Navy and converted to an auxiliary minesweeper under Reserve Lieutenant (Junior Grade) Okazaki Hiroshi (岡崎寛). Hiroshi served as captain until he was replaced by Reserve Lieutenant Sekiguchi Yoshitaka (關口吉孝) on May 25 1944. On 4 September 1944, Sekiguchi was replaced by Reserve Lieutenant Ouchi Masayuki (大内正之). All three ships were sunk. She was struck from the Navy list on 25 January 1945.

References

1928 ships
Ships built in Japan
Maritime incidents in January 1945
World War II minesweepers of Japan
Mine warfare vessels of the Imperial Japanese Navy